Leandro Netto de Macedo (born 7 May 1979) is a Brazilian footballer who plays as a centre forward.

Football career
Netto was born in Rio de Janeiro. He began his senior career with Sport Club Corinthians Paulista and Clube Atlético Paranaense in the Série A, and also played with Madureira Esporte Clube in the Campeonato Carioca.

With the exception of one year in Serbia in the First League of FR Yugoslavia, and a few months in Spain with Deportivo de La Coruña's reserves (loaned by Académica de Coimbra), Netto spent his first eight years as a professional in Portugal, representing five teams almost always in the second division. His only Primeira Liga experience occurred in 2005–06, when he went scoreless for Gil Vicente F.C. in a relegation-ending season, due to irregularities; in the 2006 January transfer window, he had already moved to Leixões SC.

After one year in Syria with Al-Karamah SC – which he helped win the double in 2007 – Netto played in his native Brazil, including a spell in the regional leagues, after which he settled in China with Henan Construction FC. He helped the newly promoted Chinese Super League side to the third place in 2009, and consistently ranked amongst the competition's top scorers in the following campaigns.

In 2014, Netto returned to Brazil: after a brief spell with Clube Atlético Metropolitano, he joined Série B club Sampaio Corrêa Futebol Clube.

In 2016, he played for the second team of Henan Construction since January till September, and then in Outumn he played with Boca Raton FC in the American Premier Soccer League.

Honours
Al-Karamah
Syrian Premier League: 2006–07
Syrian Cup: 2006–07

Brasiliense
Campeonato Brasiliense: 2008

References

External links

1979 births
Living people
Footballers from Rio de Janeiro (city)
Brazilian footballers
Association football forwards
Campeonato Brasileiro Série A players
Campeonato Brasileiro Série B players
Campeonato Brasileiro Série C players
Campeonato Brasileiro Série D players
Sport Club Corinthians Paulista players
Club Athletico Paranaense players
Madureira Esporte Clube players
Brasiliense Futebol Clube players
Clube Atlético Metropolitano players
Sampaio Corrêa Futebol Clube players
Primeira Liga players
Liga Portugal 2 players
Associação Académica de Coimbra – O.A.F. players
A.D. Ovarense players
Gil Vicente F.C. players
Leixões S.C. players
C.D. Trofense players
OFK Beograd players
Al-Karamah players
Chinese Super League players
China League One players
Henan Songshan Longmen F.C. players
Hunan Billows players
Brazilian expatriate footballers
Expatriate footballers in Portugal
Expatriate footballers in Spain
Expatriate footballers in Serbia and Montenegro
Expatriate footballers in Syria
Expatriate footballers in China
Expatriate soccer players in the United States
Brazilian expatriate sportspeople in Portugal
Brazilian expatriate sportspeople in Serbia and Montenegro
Brazilian expatriate sportspeople in China
Boca Raton FC players
Syrian Premier League players